Tandwa is a village in the Tandwa CD block in the Simaria subdivision of  the Chatra district in the Indian state of Jharkhand.

Geography

Location                            

Area overview
The map alongside shows that the forests (mark the light shading), covering around 60% of Chatra district, are evenly spread across the district. The map provides links to three CCL operational areas.

Note: The map alongside presents some of the notable locations in the district. All places marked in the map are linked in the larger full screen map.

Demographics
According to the 2011 Census of India, Tandwa (location code 349450) had a total population of 6,475 of which 3,438 (53%) were males and 3,037 (47%) were females. Population in the age range 0–6 years was 1,081. The total number of literate persons in Tandwa was 3,948 (73.19% of the population over 6 years).

Civic administration

Police station
Tandwa police station serves Tandwa CD block.

CD block HQ
Headquarters of Tandwa CD block is at Tandwa village.

Economy

North Karanpura Thermal Power Station
NTPC Limited is constructing the 3 X 660 MW North Karanpura Thermal Power Station at Tandwa at an appraised current (2015) estimated cost of  14,366.58 crore. Efforts are on to get the first unit of the North Karanpura Thermal Power Station ready in 2021.

Coal mining
The North Karanpura Coalfield is spread across parts of Ranchi, Hazaribagh, Chatra and Latehar districts of Jharkhand covering an area of 1,230 km2. This coalfield in the upper reaches of the Damodar Valley, has reserves of around 14 billion tonnes of coal, very little of which has been exploited. Karkatta, KD Hesalong, Manki, Churi, Bachara UG, Bachara OC, and Dakara are long established collieries south of the Damodar. North of the Damodar lies comparatively new major mines such as Piparwar Mine and Ashoka Project. 23 mines are planned in the northern sector. Those in an advanced stage of planning are: Dhadu, Purnadih, Magadh, and Amrapali. This happens to be the largest mining sector of Central Coalfields Limited.

Future mega projects in the area include: Magadh opencast project expansion with nominal capacity of 51 million tonnes per year and peak capacity of 70 million tonnes per year, Amrapali OCP expansion with nominal capacity 25 MTY and peak capacity of 35 MTY, Sanghamitra OCP with nominal capacity of 20 MTY and peak capacity of 27 MTY, and  Chandragupta OCP with nominal capacity of 15 MTY and peak capacity of 20 MTY.

Education
Vananchal College was established at Tandwa in 1985. It is affiliated with the Vinoba Bhave University.

Transport
State Highway 7 (Hazaribagh-Tandwa-Tangar Road) passes through Tandwa.

References

Villages in Chatra district